The Rime of the Ancient Mariner  is a 1978 TV film by Ken Russell. It was co written by Melvyn Bragg.

It was screened with William and Dorothy as Clouds of Glory. The Los Angeles Times called it "flat out brilliant". The Irish Times called it "the most exciting bit of telly biography in a long time."

Cast
David Hemmings as Samuel Coleridge

References

External links

1978 television films
1978 films
British television films
Films directed by Ken Russell